Marysville Getchell High School is a public high school in Marysville, Washington, United States. It is part of the Marysville School District.

The campus has a student capacity of 1,600 in grades 9-12 and previously was organized into four small learning communities (SLCs): the Academy of Construction and Engineering (ACE), the BioMed Academy (BIO), the International School of Communications (ISC), and the School for the Entrepreneur (SFE). However, starting in the 2019-2020 school year, the school instead operates with no separation between the four schools. The four schools were previously operated as academies within Marysville Pilchuck High School (MPHS), which had a student population of nearly 3,000 at the time.

The campus was funded from a bond passed in February 2006 and opened in 2010.

Facilities 
Each academy/school occupies its own building that is organized with classrooms surrounding commons areas used for research, project-based study, interdisciplinary work, and interaction. To accommodate future expansion, extra classrooms were added to each building and outdoor rooftop decks were designed to permit enclosure. With Washington's cold weather in mind, the railings throughout the Marysville Getchell Campus are heated for the students' comfort.

The facility has received several design awards, including the 2011 Council of Educational Facilities Planners International's James D. MacConnell Award, an international award for excellence in school design. The architects for the campus were DLR Group.

Design and green features 
The buildings' identities are transmitted through bright-colored accents and subtle graphics. The structures rise from masonry bases, while exposed steel beams and abundant windows create a sense of lightness. The expansive windows provide views between interior spaces and to the forests outside. The building exteriors are clad in aluminum, fiber cement board, and high-efficiency glass. Environmentally friendly features include skylights to bring natural light into the building to reduce daytime artificial lighting and using the forest shade and operable windows in lieu of a mechanical cooling system. West of the football field are the remaining evergreen trees in a protected wetland. A natural area to the north of the school still exists as protected wetland with several mature trees. The buildings have been recognized by the Public Utilities District as being energy efficient. Some features that contribute to lowering overall energy costs are:

• Interior lighting that beats code by 24 percent.

• Interior day lighting features and light fixtures with automatic dimmable ballasts.

• Exterior lighting that utilizes a mix of LED and ceramic metal halide lamps.

• Heating and ventilation measures including variable flow motors and pumps, and vacancy sensors to control fans.

Collectively, these measures represent projected annual savings of nearly 353,000 kilowatt-hours and projected annual savings of $27,705 in electricity costs.

References

External links
 School District webpage
 School website

High schools in Snohomish County, Washington
Marysville, Washington
Public high schools in Washington (state)